Bert Jacobs (23 September 1929 – 1994) was an Australian equestrian. He competed in the individual jumping event at the 1956 Summer Olympics.

References

External links
 

1929 births
1994 deaths
Australian male equestrians
Olympic equestrians of Australia
Equestrians at the 1956 Summer Olympics
Place of birth missing